This incomplete list of former FBI Ten Most Wanted Fugitives are convicted felons that have been on the list of the FBI Ten Most Wanted Fugitives.

Former FBI Ten Most Wanted Fugitives by decade

Former FBI Ten Most Wanted Fugitives, 1950s

Former FBI Ten Most Wanted Fugitives, 1960s

Former FBI Ten Most Wanted Fugitives, 1970s

Former FBI Ten Most Wanted Fugitives, 1980s

Former FBI Ten Most Wanted Fugitives, 1990s

Former FBI Ten Most Wanted Fugitives, 2000s

Former FBI Ten Most Wanted Fugitives, 2010s

Former FBI Ten Most Wanted Fugitives, 2020s

See also
 FBI Ten Most Wanted Fugitives

References